Master of the Game is the debut solo album by James "J.T." Taylor, previously known as a member of Kool & the Gang. It was released by MCA Records in 1989, and peaked at No. 77 on the Billboard R&B chart.

Track listing

References

External links
 
 Master of the Game at Discogs
 Official website
 Myspace

1989 debut albums
James "J.T." Taylor albums
MCA Records albums